Judith Moffett (born 1942) is an American author and academic. She has published poetry, nonfiction, science fiction, and translations of Swedish literature. She has been awarded grants and fellowships from the National Endowment for the Arts and the National Endowment for the Humanities and presented a paper on the translation of poetry at a 1998 Nobel Symposium.

She began her career writing poetry and about poets, including a 1984 book about James Merrill, who was both her friend and mentor. Moffett still writes for organizations such as the Academy of American Poets. She did not publish science fiction until 1986, but gained almost immediate attention by winning the first Theodore Sturgeon Award in 1987. Her first novel, Pennterra in 1987, further enhanced her reputation. It is noted both for its treatment of alien sexuality and as an example of Quakers in science fiction. In the following year, 1988, she won the John W. Campbell Award for Best New Writer in Science Fiction. In 1989 her novella "Tiny Tango" also received award nominations.

Bibliography

Novels
Pennterra (Congdon & Weed, 1987; reprint edition, Fantastic Books, 2009; ebook editions: SF Gateway/Orion Publishing Group, 2015)
The Ragged World (Holy Ground Trilogy, Book 1, St. Martin's Press, 1991; ebook editions: SF Gateway/Orion Publishing Group, 2015)
Time, Like an Ever-Rolling Stream (Holy Ground Trilogy, Book 2, St. Martin's Press, 1992; ebook editions: SF Gateway/Orion Publishing Group, 2015)
The Bird Shaman (Holy Ground Trilogy, Book 3, Bascom Hill Publishing Group, 2008; ebook editions: SF Gateway/Orion Publishing Group, 2015)

Collections
Keeping Time: Poems (LSU Press, 1976, poems)
Whinny Moor Crossing (Princeton University Press, 1984, poems)
Two that Came True (Pulphouse Publishing, Author's Choice Monthly #19, 1991, science-fiction stories; ebook edition: SF Gateway/Orion Publishing Group, 2015)
Tarzan in Kentucky (David Robert Books, 2015, poems)
The Bear's Baby and Other Stories (SF Gateway/Orion Publishing Group, 2017, ebook edition, short stories)

Chapbooks
Tiny Tango (Amazon Digital Publishing ebook, 2014)

Translations from the Swedish
Gentleman, Single, Refined and Selected Poems, 1937-1959 by Hjalmar Gullberg   (LSU Press, 1979)
The North! To The North! Five Swedish Poets of the Nineteenth Century  (Southern Illinois University Press, 2001)

Short stories
 "After Three Wordsworths" (Shenandoah, March 1980)
 "Surviving" (F&SF, June 1986)
 "The Hob" (Asimov's, May 1988)
 "Tiny Tango" (Asimov's, February 1989)
 "Not Without Honor" (Asimov's, May 1989)
 "Remembrance of Things Future" (Asimov's, December 1989)
 "I, Said the Cow" (F&SF, January 1990)
 "Final Tomte" (F&SF, June 1990)
 "The Ragged Rock" (Asimov's, December 1990)
 "Chickasaw Slave" (Asimov's, September 1991) (collected in Mike Resnick's anthology Alternate Presidents in 1992)
 "The Realms of Glory" (Heaven Sent, Peter Crowther and Martin H. Greenberg, eds, DAW Books,  1995)
 "The Bradshaw" (F&SF, October 1998)
 "The Bear's Baby" (F&SF, October/November 2003)
 "The Bird Shaman's Girl" (F&SF, October/November 2007)
 "The Middle of Somewhere" (Welcome to the Greenhouse, Gordon Van Gelder, ed, OR Books, 2011)
 "Ten Lights and Darks" (F&SF, January/February 2013)
 "Space Ballet" (Tor.com, February 4, 2014)

Non-fiction
"The Habit of Imagining" (essay about The Golden Rule, The Christian Century, Vol. 92, December 24, 1975)
James Merrill: An Introduction to the Poetry (Columbia University Press, 1984)
 "Confessions of a Metamorph" (essay, Kenyon Review, New Series, Vol. 15, Fall 1993)
Homestead Year: Back to the Land in Suburbia (Lyons & Burford, 1995; revised trade paperback edition, iUniverse, 2011)
"Days of 1973: A Week in Athens" (an excerpt from a James Merrill memoir, Notre Dame Review, Summer/Fall 2012)
"Strange Attractor: On James Merrill (and myself) in and out of the classroom," The Smart Set, Drexel University, 07/23/2015
"Mixed Messages" (an excerpt from Unlikely Friends: A Memoir; begins on page 17 at the link)
Unlikely Friends - James Merrill and Judith Moffett: A Memoir (Amazon Digital Services, 2019; ebook and print editions)

Awards, honors, and recognitions
 1967  Fulbright Teaching Fellowship to the University of Lund, Sweden
 1971  First prize, Graduate Division, in the Academy of American Poets Contest at the University of Pennsylvania
 1973  Fulbright Travel Grant to Sweden
 1973  Eunice Tietjens Prize from Poetry magazine
 1976  First Ingram Merrill Foundation Grant in poetry
 1976  Levinson Prize from Poetry magazine
 1978  Columbia University Translation Center Award
 1980  Second Ingram Merrill Foundation Grant
 1981  Poem "Scatsquall in Spring" included in Pushcart IV:  Best of the Small Presses annual collection
 1982  Annual Translation Prize of the Swedish Academy
 1983  National Endowment for the Humanities Translation Grant
 1984  National Endowment for the Arts Creative Writing Fellowship Grant
 1987  "Surviving": won the Theodore Sturgeon Memorial Award for the best science fiction story of the year; also a finalist for a 1986 Nebula Award in the novelette category
 1988  Received the John W. Campbell Award for Best New Writer at the World Science Fiction Convention in New Orleans
 1989  "The Hob": a finalist for the 1988 Nebula Award in the novelette category
 1990  "Tiny Tango": a finalist for the 1989 Nebula Award and the 1990 Hugo Award in the novella category
 1991  Third Ingram Merrill Foundation Grant for poetry and translation
 1991  The Ragged World: a New York Times Notable Book
 1992  Time, Like an Ever-Rolling Stream: a New York Times Notable Book and shortlisted for the James Tiptree Jr. Award
 1994  Translation grant from the Swedish Academy
 1998  Presenter at the Nobel Symposium on Translation of Poetry and Poetic Prose
 1999  One-year stipend from the Swedish Authors' Fund
 2015  Presenter, "Mixed Messages" (an excerpt from Unlikely Friends: A Memoir), at the James Merrill Symposium, Washington University in St. Louis

References

External links
 Finding aid to the Daniel Hoffman letters to Judith Moffett, 1970-2012, Ms. Coll. 1026 at the University of Pennsylvania Libraries
Author's Official Site
Judith Moffett Literary Correspondence Collection at Western Michigan University
The Judith Moffett Papers at Hanover College
1994 Author Interview conducted by academic and critic Farah Mendlesohn
Judith Moffett at SF Gateway/Orion Publishing Group
Judith Moffett at The Encyclopedia of Science Fiction

Judith Moffett at Fantastic Fiction
Beth Fish Reads blog Spotlight on... Pennsylvania Authors: February 15, 2010 — Judith Moffett
2020 Author Interview conducted by Rhett Morgan for Kirkus Reviews

1942 births
Living people
20th-century American novelists
21st-century American novelists
American science fiction writers
American women short story writers
American women novelists
John W. Campbell Award for Best New Writer winners
Women science fiction and fantasy writers
20th-century American women writers
21st-century American women writers
20th-century American short story writers
21st-century American short story writers